Margaret Lockwood may refer to:

Margaret Lockwood (1916–1990), British actress
Margaret Lockwood (badminton) (born 1952), badminton player from England
Margaret Lockwood (cricketer) (1911–1999), cricketer from England
Margaret Lockwood (bowls), England international lawn bowler